, stylized as NEWS WATCH 9 is the flagship evening news program of the public Japanese broadcaster, NHK. It airs weekdays on NHK General Television and worldwide on NHK World Premium and is also available on the networks video-on-demand service. Currently, it is presented by Masayoshi Tanaka, Minoru Aoi and Izumi Yamauchi. The program has been broadcast by the network since 1961, although it has been using its current title only from 2006.

It is broadcast on weekdays, from 9:00 pm to 10:00 pm (JST), and features national and international news, commentary, sports and weather. Unlike most newscasts, NW9 prohibits the use of full scripts and limits the use of teleprompters.

History
NEWS WATCH 9 was conceived as a part of NHK G reformatting. It replaced two news programs; NHK NEWS 9 and NHK NEWS 10, the former being a fifteen-minute broadcast and the latter a popular 55-minute news magazine program. Aside from consolidating the two shows into a single, one-hour newscast, the new show was put into the 9:00 pm time slot, when most Japanese are at home and awake.

The show was launched on April 3, 2006, and was presented by Hideo Yanagisawa, who provided the commentary, and newsreader, Toshie Ito. Yanagisawa left the program on October 31, 2007, due to complications of lung disease. The commentary was provided by several NHK NEWS contributors, before Hidetoshi Fujisawa joined the program two weeks later, on November 19. Ito and Fujisawa left news program on March 28, 2008.

The show relaunched on March 31, 2008, with a new set and updated graphics, with Goro Taguchi and former News Watch sportscaster Yuko Aoyama providing commentary and news respectively. Kensuke Okoshi is the current commentator, replacing Taguchi on March 29, 2010. In April 2011, Yuko Aoyama was replacing for Asahi Inoue. On March 30, 2015, Okoshi and Inoue are replaced by Kenji Kono and Naoko Suzuki.
On April 3, 2017, they were replaced by NEWS CHECK 11 hosts, Maho Kuwako and Yoshio Arima which previously they left the show. But on March 30, 2020, Kuwako was replaced by Mayuko Wakuda. On March 29, 2021, Arima was replaced by a former NHK Washington D.C. bureau chief, Masayoshi Tanaka.

The show relaunched on April 4, 2022, with a new set and updated graphics. The show was switched to three-anchor format. Mayuko Wakuda position was replaced by Izumi Yamauchi. Minoru Aoi, who previously left NHK News 7, joined the show as its third anchor.

Chronology
The table lists the chronology of programs 9:00 pm NHK news programs.

Presenters
Main Presenters
Masayoshi Tanaka - Presenter (March 2021 – Present)
Minoru Aoi - News reader (April 2022 – Present)
Izumi Yamauchi - News reader (April 2022 – Present)
Hideo Yanagisawa (April 2006 - October 2007)
Hidetoshi Fujisawa (November 2007 - March 2008)
Toshie Itō - News reader (April 2006 - March 2008)
Yuko Aoyama - (March 2008 - March 2011)
Goro Taguchi (March 2008 - March 2010)
Kensuke Ōkoshi - Presenter (March 2010 - March 2015)
Asahi Inoue - News reader (April 2011 - March 2015)
Kenji Kōno - Presenter (March 2015 – March 2017)
Naoko Suzuki - News reader (March 2015 – March 2017)
Yoshio Arima - Presenter (April 2017 – March 2021)
Maho Kuwako - News reader (March 2017 – March 2020)
Mayuko Wakuda - News reader (March 2020 – April 2022)
Correspondents
Yōji Nakamichi (March 2021 – Present)
Miki Toyoshima (April 2022 – Present)
Masayuki Sanjō (March 2015 – March 2017)
Daisuke Kobayashi (March 2015 – March 2017)
Izumi Tanaka (March 2015 – March 2017)
Nozomi Kurihara (April 2017 – April 2019)
Sayuri Hori (April 2017 – March 2018)
Mitsuki Uehara (April 2018 – March 2019)
Hitoshi Fukagawa (April 2019 – March 2021)
Makoto Hoshi (April 2019 – April 2022)
Tomohiro Hatta (April 2020 – April 2022)
Hikaru Urushibara (April 2021 – April 2022)
Sports Presenters
Shuhei Takayanagi (April 2022 – Present)
Miki Toyoshima (April 2022 – Present)
Yuko Aoyama (April 2006 – March 2008)
Ayako Ichinayagi (March 2008 – April 2011)
Tomomi Hirose (April 2011 – March 2015)
Aya Sasaki (March 2015 – March 2017)
Tadayuki Ichihashi (April 2017 – March 2021)
Takuya Tadokoro (March 2021 – April 2022)

Weather
Kimiharu Saita (April 2016 – Present)
Nobuyuki Hirai (April 2006 – April 2011)
Hiroko Ida (April 2011 – March 2016)

International Broadcast
The program is available on NHK World Premium and TV Japan. It was also available on its global news and information channel, NHK World until January 30, 2009, where it was aired with an English voice-over.

External links

NHK News (Japanese)
Official Twitter account

Japanese television news shows
2006 Japanese television series debuts
2010s Japanese television series
NHK original programming
Flagship evening news shows
NHK